Antoine Payen (20 June 1902 - 1985) was a French animator whose most notable work was in advertising. He was born in Paris.

References

French animators
French animated film directors
Film people from Paris
1902 births
1985 deaths